Soulvache is a commune in the Loire-Atlantique department in western France.

Geography
The Brutz forms all of the commune's western border, then flows into the Semnon, which forms all of its northern border.

See also
Communes of the Loire-Atlantique department

References

Communes of Loire-Atlantique